The 2014–15 Montreal Canadiens season was the 106th season of play for the franchise that was founded on December 4, 1909, and was also their 98th season in the National Hockey League.

Off-season
Defenceman Douglas Murray, forward George Parros and forward Thomas Vanek became free agents. On July 1, 2014, captain Brian Gionta signed with the Buffalo Sabres, being joined by defenseman Josh Gorges, who was traded to the team the same day for the Minnesota Wild's 2016 second round pick previously acquired in a trade for Matt Moulson. Notable free agent signing included defenseman Tom Gilbert, centre Manny Malhotra and prospect Jiri Sekac, formally of the Kontinental Hockey League (KHL). On August 2, 2014, after months of ongoing negotiations, defenceman P. K. Subban signed an eight-year contract extension worth $72 million, avoiding salary arbitration. Subban becomes the highest paid defenseman through the 2014–15 season.

Hockey operations changes included Daniel Lacroix and Rob Ramage being appointed assistant coach and player development coach, respectively. Ramage had previously played for the Canadiens and was part of the 1993 Stanley Cup Championship team, while Lacroix worked as assistant coach with the Hamilton Bulldogs, the Canadiens' main affiliate team in the American Hockey League (AHL) during the 2009–10 season. The Canadiens also announced a reorganization within the hockey department. Rick Dudley was named senior vice president, hockey operations. Scott Mellanby was promoted to assistant general manager, to work along with Larry Carriere. Trevor Timmins was appointed vice president of player personnel, as well as retaining his responsibilities as the club's director of amateur scouting.

On June 18, 2014, it was announced that hall of famer Guy Lapointe would be honored by having his number 5 jersey retired during the 2014–15 season. Lapointe will become the 18th player to be honoured by the organization with jersey retirement and the second with the number 5, joining the late Bernie Geoffrion.

For only the second time in franchise history, the Canadiens did not name a captain, instead opting for four      alternate captains for the season. On September 15, team management named Andrei Markov, Max Pacioretty, Tomas Plekanec and P. K. Subban alternative captains.

The 2014–15 season also marked changes to television broadcast rights to the Canadiens; Réseau des sports renewed its French-language television rights to the team, agreeing to a 12-year extension. Due to Quebecor Media's exclusive national French-language broadcast rights to the NHL, RDS will now only be able to broadcast games in the team's blackout region of Quebec and eastern Canada. Regional television rights in English were acquired by Sportsnet East in a three-year deal announced by Rogers on September 2, 2014. Three regional games will also be broadcast by City Montreal.

Playoffs

 
The Montreal Canadiens entered the playoffs as the Atlantic Division regular season champions. The Canadiens won the first three games of the series en route to defeating the Senators in six games. In Game 1, Brian Flynn scored the game-winning goal at 17:17 of the second period, and recorded two assists as the Canadiens won 4–3. Montreal's P. K. Subban was given a five-minute major and a game misconduct for slashing Ottawa's Mark Stone during the second period, resulting in a microfracture of Stone's right wrist, but did not face any further League discipline. Alex Galchenyuk's goal at 3:40 into overtime gave the Canadiens a 3–2 win in Game 2. Cameron replaced Andrew Hammond with Craig Anderson as his starting goalie for Game 3, who despite a strong outing, surrendered the tying goal by but Dale Weise with 5:47 left in the third period, who also scored at 3:40 into overtime to give Montreal a 2–1 win. Anderson rebounded in Game 4, stopping all 28 Montreal shots while Mike Hoffman scored the Senators' only goal to win 1–0. Ottawa aso took Game 5 by a score of 5–1 as Anderson stopped 45 of 46 shots, with Bobby Ryan contributing two goals. The Canadiens then eliminated the Senators in Game 6 by a score of 2–0, with goaltender Carey Price registering the shutout stopping all 43 of Ottawa's shots.

In the second round, Tampa Bay Lightning defeated the Canadiens in six games. In Game 1, Nikita Kucherov scored 2:06 into double overtime to give Tampa Bay a 2–1 win. This winning goal was controversial because the Lightning appeared to have been offside on the play, but nothing was called by the linesmen. Earlier at 2:56 of the first overtime period, Kucherov's apparent winning goal was waved off after officials ruled that he pushing Carey Price's pad into the net after the Montreal goalie made the initial save. The Lightning also won Game 2, 6–2, scoring four power play goals. Montreal's Brandon Prust was then fined $5,000 for his postgame derogatory public comments directed toward Referee Brad Watson, which he later apologized for the day afterward. In Game 3, Tyler Johnson scored with 1.1 seconds left to give Tampa Bay a 2–1 victory. The Canadiens stayed alive in Game 4, as Max Pacioretty recorded a shorthanded goal and two assists, as Montreal built a 5–0 second-period lead en route to a 6–2 win. Then, in Game 5, P.A. Parenteau scored with 4:07 left in regulation to give the Canadiens a 2–1 victory. In Game 6, Ben Bishop stopped 18 of 19 Montreal shots, and Kucherov scored two goals, as Tampa Bay won 4–1 to take the series.

Standings

Suspensions/fines

Schedule and results

Pre-season

Regular season

Playoffs
Montreal defeated Ottawa in six games in the first round. After taking a 3–0 series lead, the Senators attempted a comeback, as Ottawa won the next two games. However, Price's shutout in Game 6 sealed the series victory for Montreal.

The Canadiens would face a tougher challenge in the second round against the Tampa Bay Lightning. Tampa Bay had swept the five-game regular season series from Montreal, and then proceeded to win the first three games of the series. However, on May 7, Montreal won their first game of 2014–15 against Tampa Bay, as they posted a 6–2 victory against the Lightning to save their season. Montreal would win the next game 2–1, before subsequently losing the series in Game 6 by a final score of 4–1.

Player statistics
Final
Skaters

Goaltenders

†Denotes player spent time with another team before joining the Canadiens. Stats reflect time with the Canadiens only.
‡Denotes player was traded mid-season. Stats reflect time with the Canadiens only.
Bold/italics denotes franchise record

Notable achievements

Awards

Milestones

Transactions 
The Canadiens have been involved in the following transactions during the 2014–15 season:

Trades

Free agents acquired

Free agents lost

Player signings

Draft picks

Below are the Montreal Canadiens' selections made at the 2014 NHL Entry Draft, held on June 27–28, 2014 at the Wells Fargo Center in Philadelphia. 

Draft notes
Montreal's second-round pick went to the New York Islanders, as the result of a trade on March 5, 2014 that sent Thomas Vanek and a conditional fifth-round pick in 2014 to Montreal, in exchange for Sebastian Collberg and this pick (being conditional at the time of the trade). The condition – New York would receive a second-round pick in 2014 if Montreal qualified for the 2014 Stanley Cup playoffs – was converted on April 1, 2014.
Montreal received the fifth round pick belonging to the New York Islanders, as the result of a trade on March 5, 2014 that sent Sebastian Collberg and a conditional second-round pick in 2014 to New York, in exchange for Thomas Vanek and this pick (being conditional at the time of the trade). The condition – Montreal would receive a fifth-round pick in 2014 if Montreal qualified for the 2014 Stanley Cup playoffs – was converted on April 1, 2014.
The Arizona Coyotes' third-round pick went to the Montreal Canadiens as the result of a trade on June 28, 2014 that sent a third and fourth-round pick in 2014 (87th and 117th overall) to Arizona in exchange for this pick.

References

Montreal Canadiens seasons
Montreal
Montreal